The 2022–23 Memphis Tigers men's basketball team represented the University of Memphis in the 2022–23 NCAA Division I men's basketball season. The Tigers were led by fifth-year head coach Penny Hardaway. The team played their home games at FedExForum as members of the American Athletic Conference.

Previous season
The Tigers finished the 2021–22 season 22–11, 13–5 in AAC Play to finish in third place. They defeated UCF and SMU to advance to the championship game of the AAC tournament where they lost to Houston. They received an at-large bid to the NCAA Tournament as the No. 9 seed in the West Region. There they defeated Boise State in the first round before losing in the second round to Gonzaga.

Offseason

Departing players

Incoming transfers

2022 recruiting class

Roster

Schedule and results

|-
!colspan=12 style=| Exhibition

|-
!colspan=12 style=| Non-conference regular season

|-
!colspan=12 style=| AAC regular season

|-
!colspan=12 style=| AAC tournament

|-
!colspan=12 style=|NCAA tournament

Source

Rankings

*AP does not release post-NCAA Tournament rankings

References

Memphis
Memphis Tigers men's basketball seasons
Memphis
Memphis
Memphis